"Winter Fall" is the ninth single by L'Arc-en-Ciel, released on January 28, 1998. It debuted at number 1 on the Oricon chart, making it their first number-one single. The single was re-released on August 30, 2006. It was also their first single featuring drummer Yukihiro as an official member of the band.

Track listing

Chart positions

References

1998 singles
L'Arc-en-Ciel songs
Oricon Weekly number-one singles
Songs written by Hyde (musician)
Songs written by Ken (musician)
1998 songs
Ki/oon Music singles